The 2006 Formula Nippon Championship was contested over nine rounds, with twelve teams and 25 drivers competing in the championship.  The specification chassis was the Lola FN06.  After eight seasons of a specification engine, there was a competition between engine manufacturers, as teams could choose between Toyota and Honda 3000cc Indy Racing League style specification normally aspirated engines.

Teams and drivers

Race calendar and results

 Autopolis was added after Mazda acquired the Mine Circuit, closing it to competition in February as it was converted to a test track.

Championship standings

Drivers' Championship
Scoring system

Note:

 Because of heavy rain at Fuji during the race, the event ended after two laps.  Half points were awarded because of the stoppage before the 75% point.

Teams' Championship

External links
 2006 Japanese Championship Formula Nippon

Formula Nippon
Super Formula
Nippon